The 2010–11 Lebanese Premier League is the 50th season of top-tier football in Lebanon. A total of twelve teams are competing in the league, with Al Ahed the defending champions.

Teams
Al-Ahli and Al-Hikma were relegated to the second level of Lebanese football after ending the 2009–10 season in the bottom two places. Promoted from the second level were Al Ikhaa Al Ahli and Salam Sour.

Stadia and locations

Final league table

Positions by round

Fixtures and results

Top scorers

References

2010–11 Lebanese Premier League
Lebanese Premier League seasons
Leb
1